Vyacheslav Anatoliyovych Shevchuk (born 13 May 1979) is a retired Ukrainian professional footballer and manager, mainly known for his time as a player of FC Shakhtar Donetsk. He was capped over 50 times for the Ukraine national football team.

Career
His position is at left back but he can also play as a central defender. Shevchuk has been a reliable back-up to Răzvan Raţ and has gradually increased his attacking play over the years.

During Shakhtar's victory over Kryvbas Kryvyi Rih on 7 August 2011, Shevchuk scored his first goal for the club when he drilled home the second goal in a 2–0 win.

To date, Shevchuk has won seven Ukrainian Premier League titles, four Ukrainian Cup finals and the UEFA Cup.

In December 2016, Shevchuk announced his retirement from football.

In September 2017, he began his coaching career, leading the Shakhtar U-17 team and received a UEFA Pro coaching diploma.

Since October 2018, he headed the Premier League FC Olimpik Donetsk. On 17 April 2019 Shevchuk left the post of head coach of FC Olimpik Donetsk.

On 23 November 2021 Shevchuk was appointed as sporting director of Veres Rivne.

Career statistics

Club

References

FC Volyn Lutsk players
2006 FIFA World Cup players
Living people
1979 births
Ukrainian footballers
Footballers from Lutsk
Ukrainian expatriate footballers
Ukraine international footballers
Association football central defenders
FC Torpedo Moscow players
FC Shakhtar Donetsk players
UEFA Cup winning players
FC Shinnik Yaroslavl players
FC Metalurh Zaporizhzhia players
FC Dnipro players
FC Metalurh Donetsk players
FC Zenit Saint Petersburg players
Ukrainian Premier League players
Russian Premier League players
Expatriate footballers in Russia
Ukrainian expatriate sportspeople in Russia
Ukrainian people of Russian descent
UEFA Euro 2012 players
FC Podillya Khmelnytskyi players
UEFA Euro 2016 players
Ukrainian football managers
FC Olimpik Donetsk managers
Ukrainian Premier League managers
Sportspeople from Volyn Oblast